4U is the fourth studio album by Taiwanese singer Elva Hsiao, released on 11 February 2002 by Virgin Records Taiwan.

Track listing
 "愛你不要距離" (No Distance in Love)
 "問自己" (Ask Yourself)
 "我喜歡你快樂" (Like You Happy)
 "快歌" (Fast Song)
 "靠近一點" (Come Closer)
 "自己人" (Personal)
 "我們的寂寞" (Our Loneliness)
 "笑著愛你" (Smiling Love You)
 "因為你" (Because of You)
 "插曲" (Insert Song)
 "And I Know" (Remix)

References

2002 albums
Elva Hsiao albums